John M. Binotto  (November 24, 1919 – February 19, 2016) was a former American football halfback who played one season in  the NFL with the Pittsburgh Steelers and the Philadelphia Eagles.

Early life
Binotto was born in Lawrence, Pennsylvania,and attended Cecil High School in Cecil, Pennsylvania.

He matriculated at Duquesne University.

Football  career
Binotto was acquired by the Pittsburgh Steelers in August 1942 from the Cleveland Rams in exchange for George Platukis.  Binotto appeared in seven games for the Steelers in 1942, starting in one.  Binotto was released by the Steelers in October 1942.

Binotto joined the Philadelphia Eagles later that season, and appeared in two games for them.

References

1919 births
2016 deaths
People from Lawrence County, Pennsylvania
Players of American football from Pennsylvania
American football running backs
Duquesne Dukes football players
Pittsburgh Steelers players
Philadelphia Eagles players
People from Canonsburg, Pennsylvania